Cardiocrinum cordatum, also known as Turep in the Ainu Languages, is a Northeast Asian species of plants in the lily family. It is native to Japan and to certain Russian islands in the Sea of Okhotsk (Sakhalin, Kuril Islands).
 
Because of its large, showy flowers, Cardiocrinum cordatum is sometimes cultivated as an ornamental in regions outside its native range, though not as frequently as the related C. giganteum.

The Ainu, a group indigenous to Hokkaido, harvested the bulbs. Starch was extracted and used to create a form of dumpling.

The plant has reportedly become naturalized in the State of Maryland in the eastern United States.

References

Liliaceae
Flora of Japan
Flora of the Russian Far East
Plants described in 1925